This is an incomplete list of mosques in Oceania.

Australia

Fiji

Ahmadiyya 
There are five Ahmadiyya mosques in Fiji.

Non-denominational 
There are four non-denominational mosques in Fiji.